Decades before the video revolution of the late 1970s/early 1980s, there was a small but devoted market for home films in the 16 mm, 9,5 mm, 8 mm, and Super 8 mm film market. Because most individuals in the United States owning projectors did not have one equipped with sound, vintage silent films were particularly well-suited for the market. A number of feature films were released in full-length versions by companies such as Blackhawk from the 1960s until the market essentially evaporated in the early 1980s with the advent of home video that made collecting "films" considerably cheaper. The silent feature films were released on multi film reels, each holding approximately 20 minutes of film, and were often expensive for the era, a feature-length Super 8 mm silent film might cost over $100 in 1970s dollars.

Among the titles that were released on Super 8 mm/8 mm format were:

 America starring Neil Hamilton
 Blood and Sand starring Rudolph Valentino
 Broken Blossoms starring Lillian Gish
 Civilization directed by Thomas Ince
 College starring Buster Keaton
 Don Q Son of Zorro starring Douglas Fairbanks
 Down to the Sea in Ships starring Clara Bow
 Dr. Jekyll and Mr. Hyde starring John Barrymore
 Foolish Wives starring Erich von Stroheim
 Girl Shy starring Harold Lloyd
  The Girl in Number 29
 Grandma's Boy starring Harold Lloyd
 Intolerance directed by D.W Griffith
 It starring Clara Bow
 Little Annie Rooney starring Mary Pickford
 Nosferatu starring Max Schreck
 Orphans of the Storm starring Lillian Gish
 Peck's Bad Boy starring Jackie Coogan
 Safety Last starring Harold Lloyd
 She starring Betty Blythe
 Die Nibelungen: Siegfried directed by Fritz Lang
 Slums of Berlin directed by Gerhard Lamprecht
 Son of the Sheik starring Rudolph Valentino
 Sparrows starring Mary Pickford
 Speedy starring Harold Lloyd
 Steamboat Bill, Jr. starring Buster Keaton
 The Adventures of Tarzan starring Elmo Lincoln
 The Cabinet of Dr. Caligari starring Conrad Veidt
 The Birth of a Nation starring Lillian Gish
 The Black Pirate starring Douglas Fairbanks
 The Hunchback of Notre Dame starring Lon Chaney
 The Mark of Zorro starring Douglas Fairbanks
 The Gold Rush starring Charlie Chaplin
 The Phantom of the Opera starring Lon Chaney
 Thundering Hoofs directed by Fred Thomson
 Tillie's Punctured Romance starring Charlie Chaplin
 Tol'able David starring Richard Barthelmess
 20,000 Leagues Under the Sea starring Matt Moore
 Way Down East starring Lillian Gish
 Way Out West starring Laurel and Hardy
 Zapruder Film directed by Abraham Zapruder

See also
 Blackhawk Films

Bibliography

External links
 List of Lost Silent Films at Silent Era

Silent films released on 8